Bondarzewia berkeleyi, commonly known as Berkeley's polypore, or stump blossoms, is a species of polypore fungus in the family Russulaceae. It is a parasitic species that causes butt rot in oaks and other hardwood trees. A widespread fungus, it is found in Africa, Asia, Europe, and North America.

Elias Magnus Fries described the species as Polyporus berkeleyi in 1851. It was moved to the genus Bondarzewia in 1941.

The fan- or shelf-shaped caps grow in overlapping clumps from the bases of oak trees, each capable of growing to 25.5 cm (10 in) diameter. They are various shades of white to pale grey, cream, beige or yellow. The pore surface is white, as is the spore print. The round spores are 7–9 by 6–8 μm and have marked amyloid ridges. The tough white flesh can be up to 3 cm (1.2 in) thick and has a mild taste, which can be bitter in older specimens. The outer edges that cut easily with a knife are quite tender.  Although Bondarzewia berkeleyi has been compared to eating shoe leather, some field guides list it as edible. It may be able to be used to strengthen other flavors in dishes, much like tofu. It can also reportedly be used as a meat substitute. Other field guides list it as inedible.

In China it has been recorded from Guangdong and Hunan provinces. The fruit bodies appear over July to October in the United States. A survey of host trees in North Carolina found that it almost always grew on oaks, being recorded from the white oak (Quercus alba),  scarlet oak (Q. coccinea),  southern red oak (Q. falcata),  chestnut oak (Q. prinus) and eastern black oak (Q. velutina), as well as bird cherry (Prunus pensylvanica).

See also
Largest fungal fruit bodies

References

External links

Fungi described in 1851
Fungi of Africa
Fungi of Asia
Fungi of Europe
Fungi of North America
Russulales
Taxa named by Elias Magnus Fries